Prolecanitoidea is a taxonomic superfamily of ammonites, fossil cephalopods. This is one of two superfamilies in the Prolecanitida. The other is the Medlicottioidea.

The Prolecanitoidea are found in the Upper Devonian to the Middle Permian and are recognized basically by their generally smooth discoidal to lentincular shells which have a large umbilicus and goniatitic to ceratitic sutures. In this order, suture complexity developed by the addition of lobes from the umbilical area, across the flanks, during the life (ontogeny) of the animal, and phylogenetically with succeeding genera.

The Prolecanitoidea combines two related families, the ancestral Prolecanitidae and the derived Daraelitidae. A third family, the Prodromitidae has been abandoned and its sole genus, Prodromites included in the Prolecanitidae. These two families differ primarily in the complexity of the suture which is simpler and goniatitic in the Prodromitidae and more complex and ceratitic in the Daraelitidae. The Prolecanitoidea are distinguished from the Medlicottioidea primarily by their rounded rather than flat or grooved vente and large as opposed to small umbilici.

The Prolecanitoidea were previously known by the name, Prolecanitaceae, prior to the recent ruling of the ICZN regarding superfamilies. The suffix -oidea was previously used for some time in invertebrate taxonomies as the ending for subclasses, e.g. Ammonoidea. The Medlicottioidea are also sometimes known as the suborder Prolecanitina.

References 

 Miller, Furnish, and Schindewolf, 1957; Paleozoic Ammonoidea, esp. superfamily Prolecanitaceae, L69, in The Treatise on Invertebrate Paleontology, Part L, Ammonoidea.
 Saunders and Work; Abstract:  Evolution of shell morphology and suture complexity in Paleozoic prolecanitids... 

Prolecanitida
Prehistoric animal superfamilies
Late Devonian first appearances
Late Devonian animals
Guadalupian extinctions